JCU may refer to:
 James Cook University, in Queensland, Australia
 John Cabot University, in Rome, Italy
 John Carroll University, in Ohio, United States
 Joint Communications Unit, of the United States Special Operations Command 
 Ceuta Heliport
 University of South Bohemia in České Budějovice